Huehue Huitzilihuitl Born 1227, died 1299, ("Huitzilihuitl the Elder", to distinguish him from Huitzilihuitl who ruled Tenochtitlan) was the tlatoani ("ruler" or "king") of the Aztec while they were settled at Chapultepec in the 13th century (1272–1299).

When the Mexica were attacked and driven from Chapultepec, Huehue Huitzilihuitl was captured and brought to Culhuacan next to his daughter where they were sacrificed. The Mexica would not again be ruled by a tlatoani until after their settlement at Tenochtitlan, where they took Acamapichtli as their leader.

References

13th-century deaths
Tlatoque
Executed monarchs
Aztec people
Year of birth unknown